The Public Security Service or VST is a Lithuanian law enforcement agency under the Ministry of the Interior. It is primarily involved in restoring the public order and serving as the main riot police force equipped for riot control.

VST is a partner of the European Gendarmerie Force.

History 

The origins of the special purpose law enforcement can be traced back to the armed formations of the Lithuanian Tribunal in the 17th century, specifically the Infantry Company of the Lithuanian Tribunal. The modern precursor of the institution was the Brigade of the Local Army established in February 1920, but disbanded a few years later.

The current institution was formed on 18 October 1991 and was known as the Internal Service Unit until 2002 when, following its reorganization, it was renamed to the Public Security Service. The institution is regulated by the Law on the Public Security Service 2006.

Equipment 

Some of the VST equipment includes:
 Volkswagen Crafter vans, Iveco EuroCargo and Mercedes-Benz Atego transporters (used for convoy and prisoner transport)
 Ford F550 armored cars and IAG Guardian armoured personnel carriers

See also 
 European Gendarmerie Force
 Mobile field force
 Riot police

References

External links
Official site

Government agencies established in 1997
Specialist law enforcement agencies of Lithuania
Law enforcement in Lithuania